This is a summary of differentiation rules, that is, rules for computing the derivative of a function in calculus.

Elementary rules of differentiation 

Unless otherwise stated, all functions are functions of real numbers (R) that return real values; although more generally, the formulae below apply wherever they are well defined — including the case of complex numbers (C).

Constant term rule

Proof
By the definition of the derivative,

This shows that the derivative of any constant function is 0.

Differentiation is linear

In Leibniz's notation this is written as:

Special cases include:
 The constant factor rule 
 The sum rule 
 The subtraction rule

The product rule

For the functions f and g, the derivative of the function h(x) = f(x) g(x) with respect to x is

In Leibniz's notation this is written

The chain rule

The derivative of the function  is

In Leibniz's notation, this is written as:

often abridged to

Focusing on the notion of maps, and the differential being a map , this is written in a more concise way as:

The inverse function rule

If the function  has an inverse function , meaning that  and  then

In Leibniz notation, this is written as

Power laws, polynomials, quotients, and reciprocals

The polynomial or elementary power rule

If , for any real number  then 

When  this becomes the special case that if  then 

Combining the power rule with the sum and constant multiple rules permits the computation of the derivative of any polynomial.

The reciprocal rule

The derivative of for any (nonvanishing) function  is:

 wherever  is non-zero.

In Leibniz's notation, this is written

The reciprocal rule can be derived either from the quotient rule, or from the combination of power rule and chain rule.

The quotient rule

 wherever  is nonzero.

This can be derived from the product rule and the reciprocal rule.

Generalized power rule

The elementary power rule generalizes considerably.

wherever both sides are well defined.

Special cases
 The reciprocal rule may be derived as the special case where .

Derivatives of exponential and logarithmic functions 

the equation above is true for all , but the derivative for  yields a complex number.

the equation above is also true for all , but yields a complex number if .

where  is the Lambert W function

Logarithmic derivatives

The logarithmic derivative is another way of stating the rule for differentiating the logarithm of a function (using the chain rule):
 wherever  is positive.

Logarithmic differentiation is a technique which uses logarithms and its differentiation rules to simplify certain expressions before actually applying the derivative.

Logarithms can be used to remove exponents, convert products into sums, and convert division into subtraction — each of which may lead to a simplified expression for taking derivatives.

Derivatives of trigonometric functions 

It is common to additionally define an inverse tangent function with two arguments, .  Its value lies in the range  and reflects the quadrant of the point .  For the first and fourth quadrant (i.e. ) one has .  Its partial derivatives are

Derivatives of hyperbolic functions

See Hyperbolic functions for restrictions on these derivatives.

Derivatives of special functions
Gamma function

Riemann Zeta function

Derivatives of integrals

Suppose that it is required to differentiate with respect to x the function

Then for :

This formula is the general form of the Leibniz integral rule and can be derived using the 
fundamental theorem of calculus.

Derivatives to nth order
Some rules exist for computing the -th derivative of functions, where  is a positive integer.  These include:

Faà di Bruno's formula

where  and the set  consists of all non-negative integer solutions of the Diophantine equation .

General Leibniz rule

See also

References

Sources and further reading
These rules are given in many books, both on elementary and advanced calculus, in pure and applied mathematics. Those in this article (in addition to the above references) can be found in:
Mathematical Handbook of Formulas and Tables (3rd edition), S. Lipschutz, M.R. Spiegel, J. Liu, Schaum's Outline Series, 2009, .
The Cambridge Handbook of Physics Formulas, G. Woan, Cambridge University Press, 2010, .
Mathematical methods for physics and engineering, K.F. Riley, M.P. Hobson, S.J. Bence, Cambridge University Press, 2010, 
NIST Handbook of Mathematical Functions, F. W. J. Olver, D. W. Lozier, R. F. Boisvert, C. W. Clark, Cambridge University Press, 2010, .

External links

 Derivative calculator with formula simplification

Articles containing proofs
 

Derivatives
Derivatives
Mathematical identities
Theorems in analysis
Theorems in calculus